Jindřich Balcar (22 March 1950 – 21 November 2013) was a Czechoslovak ski jumper who competed from 1974 to 1976. He finished 27th in the individual normal hill event at the 1976 Winter Olympics in Innsbruck which was also his best career finish.

References

External links
 
 
 Jindřich Balcar's profile at Sports Reference.com

1950 births
2013 deaths
Ski jumpers at the 1976 Winter Olympics
Czech male ski jumpers
Czechoslovak male ski jumpers
Olympic ski jumpers of Czechoslovakia